Harboro' Rocks (or Harborough Rocks) is a dolomitic limestone hill near the village of Brassington in the Derbyshire Peak District.

Harboro' Cave is a natural cavern in the rocks where archaeologists have found evidence of human occupants since the Ice Age. Satirist author Daniel Defoe reported in his book Tour thro' the whole Island of Great Britain (published in 1726) that a poor family of seven was living in the cave. Defoe described how the father was a lead miner and was "lean as a skeleton, pale as a dead corps" but that they "seemed to live very pleasantly". The cave is a protected Scheduled Monument. There is a settlement site and chambered cairns nearby.

The Golconda lead mine, on the north east side of the hill, was part of the Gell family's Griffe Grange mining liberty, which ran from the summit of Harboro' Rocks to Via Gellia. Golconda is a name used for wealthy mines, after the famous Indian Golconda diamond mine. The mine's tunnels enter natural caverns such as the Great Shack. After closing in 1913, the mine was reopened in 1915 to mine baryte until 1953. Furnace-lining bricks have been manufactured from local quartz sand at Harborough brickworks for many years (recently by Hobens Minerals and previously by Swan Ratcliffe).

Most of the White Peak is a carboniferous limestone plateau. This unusual jagged outcrop of dolomitic limestone offers interesting buttresses, arêtes and pinnacles for rock climbing (and some easy bouldering) with over 100 graded routes.

Nearby Rainster Rocks is another dolomitic limestone crag and is the site of a Romano-British settlement and field system from the 3rd century. The remains include enclosures with walls made of upright boulders (orthostats) and earthwork terraces. Excavations have found pottery fragments, metalwork and coins. The site is a listed ancient Scheduled Monument. Rainster Rocks was also a popular rock climbing location (with over 80 graded routes) and has been climbed for over 100 years. However the landowners have imposed an outright ban on climbing there since 2018.

The land around Harboro' Rocks is designated as "Open Access" land for the public, following the Countryside and Rights of Way Act 2000.

The High Peak Trail and the Midshires Way footpaths follow the same route along the south west side of the hill. The Limestone Way long-distance footpath passes the north west side of the hill.

References 

Mountains and hills of the Peak District
Mountains and hills of Derbyshire
Peak District
Mining in Derbyshire